Robert Nedoma (born 1961) is an Austrian philologist who is Professor at Department for Scandinavian Studies at the University of Vienna. He specializes in Germanic studies and Old Norse studies.

Biography
Robert Nedoma was born in 1961 in Ternitz, Austria. He gained his PhD at the University of Vienna in 1987 with a dissertation on Wayland the Smith, and subsequently worked as a researcher at the Institute for Germanic Studies at the University of Vienna.  He completed his habilitation in 2004 with a thesis on Germanic names and runes, and was appointed an associate professor at the University of Vienna in 2010. Since 2019, Nedoma has been Professor at the Department for Scandinavian Studies at the University of Vienna.

Nedoma specializes in Old Norse language and Old Norse literature, runology, Germanic names, and Germanic Antiquity. He is the author of a number of articles for the second edition of the Reallexikon der Germanischen Altertumskunde, and an editor of many journals, including Die Sprache, Philologica Germanica and North-Western European Language Evolution.

Nedoma was elected a member of the Royal Gustavus Adolphus Academy in 2018, a member of the Norwegian Academy of Science and Letters in 2020, and a member of the Austrian Academy of Sciences in 2022.

Selected works
 Die bildlichen und schriftlichen Denkmäler der Wielandsage, 1988
 Gautreks saga konungs, 1990
 Die Inschrift auf dem Helm B von Negau: Möglichkeiten und Grenzen der Deutung norditalischer epigraphischer Denkmäler., 1995
 (Publisher) Erzählen im mittelalterlichen Skandinavien, 2000
 (Editor) Female Voices of the North I: An Anthology, 2002
 Personennamen in südgermanischen Runeninschriften, 2004
 Kleine Grammatik des Altisländischen, 2006
 Anmerkning til skrifttegna pä omslagbaksida til den islandske homilieboka, 2006
 Runenschrift und Runeninschriften - eine kurze Einführung, 2007
 Altisländisches Lesebuch, 2011
 (Publisher) Erzählen im mittelalterlichen Skandinavien II, 2014
 (Publisher) Grammarians, skalds and rune carvers, 2016
 Zwei runenlose Fibeln aus dem langobardischen Gräberfeld von Maria Ponsee, Gemeinde Zwentendorf (Bezirk Tulln, Niederösterreich), 2019

See also
 Heinrich Beck
 Helmut Birkhan
 Wilhelm Heizmann
 Hermann Reichert
 Michael Schulte
 Rudolf Simek

Sources

External links
 Personal website of Robert Nedoma
 Robert Nedoma at the website of the University of Vienna
 Robert Nedoma at the website of the German Academic Exchange Service
 Robert Nedoma in the OPAC of Regesta Imperii

1961 births
Austrian editors
Austrian non-fiction writers
Austrian philologists
Germanic studies scholars
Linguists of Germanic languages
Members of the Norwegian Academy of Science and Letters
Members of the Royal Gustavus Adolphus Academy
Living people
Old Norse studies scholars
Runologists
Scandinavian studies scholars
University of Vienna alumni
Academic staff of the University of Vienna